Aspuraces I  was a catholicos of the Armenian Apostolic Church. He reigned from 381 to 386 AD and third of three catholicoi from the Albaniosid Dynasty.

Catholicoi of Armenia
4th-century Armenian bishops